Romine Corner is an extinct town that was located in Mound Township in Warren County, Indiana, west of the town of Covington.

A few buildings in the community exist, and it is still cited by the USGS.  Auto parts manufacturer Flex-N-Gate operates a facility near the site.

Geography
The site is near both State Road 63 to the west and Interstate 74 to the south. The Wabash River flows northeast of Romine Corner.

References

Former populated places in Warren County, Indiana
Ghost towns in Indiana